The following is a list of goalscorers in the FIFA World Cup finals. Only goals scored during regulation or extra time are included. Any goals scored during the penalty shoot-out are excluded. As of the 2022 final, sixty-two individuals have scored the total of eighty goals in all of the finals history.  Twelve players have scored multiple goals in the finals.  Geoff Hurst and Kylian Mbappé are the only men's players to score a hat trick in a final. Five players have done so via a penalty kick. Mario Mandžukić was the first player to score an own goal in a final, as well as the first to follow it up with a goal at the opponent's net. He scored the opening and closing goal of the final in 2018. Only two players have scored in two consecutive FIFA World Cup finals: Vavá and Kylian Mbappé. Only two scorers, Pelé and Kylian Mbappé, scored a finals goal as teenagers.

ESPN featured a documentary on the 34 finals goalscorers who were alive before the 2010 final.

FIFA World Cup Final goalscorers

Players with most goals in Finals

Bold indicates winning final
Parentheses indicates no goals scored

Footnotes

References

External links 
 Player photographs

Finals goalscorers
Final scorers